Pleasure Valley may refer to:

Pleasure Valley, Indiana
Pleasure Valley, West Virginia